Two ships operated by Belships were named Beljeanne:

, in service 1926–37
, in service 1947–64

Ship names